Sprang-Capelle is a former municipality in the North Brabant province of the Netherlands. It was formed in 1923 as a merger of the municipalities of Sprang, Vrijhoeve-Capelle and 's Grevelduin-Capelle. Therefore Sprang-Capelle consists of three villages: 's Grevelduin-Capelle, Vrijhoeve-Capelle and Sprang. In 1997 the municipality of Sprang-Capelle was added to the municipality of Waalwijk.  The amusement park Efteling is located in the neighbourhood of Sprang-Capelle.

Gallery

External links

Official town website of Waalwijk (in Dutch)
Pictures of the village of Capelle

Municipalities of the Netherlands disestablished in 1997
Populated places in North Brabant
Former municipalities of North Brabant
Waalwijk